Dobříš is a town in Příbram District in the Central Bohemian Region of the Czech Republic. It has about 8,700 inhabitants. It is known for the Dobříš Chateau.

Administrative parts
The village of Trnová is an administrative part of Dobříš.

Geography
Most of the municipal territory lies in the Brdy Highlands, but the town proper lies entirely in the Benešov Uplands.

In the town there is a set of ponds, fed by the Sychrovský stream and its tributary Trnovský stream. Notably, Huťský Pond is the location where muskrats, brought from North America, were first released in continental Europe.

History
The first written mention of Dobříš is from 1252, when King Wenceslaus I of Bohemia signed a treaty with the Cistercian monastery of Plasy. Temporarily held by the noble Rosenberg family, King John of Bohemia had a hunting lodge erected at Dobříš. It was devastated during the Hussite Wars in 1421.

After the Kingdom of Bohemia had passed to the Habsburg monarchy, Dobříš was given market town rights by King Ferdinand I in 1543, confirmed by his son and successor Emperor Maximilian II in 1569. The Dobříš estate was acquired by the German House of Mansfeld in 1630. After the local castle and a large part of the town were damaged by a fire in 1720, the family had the castle rebuilt into a Rococo style chateau. The estate was inherited by the Austrian Colloredo-Mansfeld dynasty in 1780.

Demographics

Economy
In the 19th century, the town became associated with the manufacturing of gloves, which began in 1865. This industry was first developed by Salamon Abeles. After World War II, a glove factory (Rukavičkářské závody) was still operating here. The factory employed 3,300 people at its peak, but the production ended in 1992. Since 1993, the tradition is held by a small company NAPA.

In the town centre and near the main road to Prague there are Bobcat factories.

Transport
The D4 motorway runs next to the town.

Sights

Dobříš Chateau is the most significant monument in the town. Its current appearance comes from the late 18th century, when the original Baroque castle was rebuilt. Currently owned again by the noble family of Colloredo-Mansfeld, it is known as a fine example of Rococo architecture and for its gardens, including a French formal garden (one of the most popular in the country) and an English landscape garden.

Notable people
Josef Balabán (1894–1941), soldier and resistance fighter
Jorge Amado (1912–2001), Brazilian writer; lived here
Jan Drda (1915–1970), writer, journalist and politician; buried here
Zélia Gattai (1916–2008), Brazilian writer; lived here
Filip Dort (born 1980), footballer; lives here

Twin towns – sister cities

Dobříš is twinned with:
 Geldrop-Mierlo, Netherlands
 Tonnerre, France

References

External links

Cities and towns in the Czech Republic
Populated places in Příbram District